Eugène Henri Callot (20 December 1875 – 22 December 1956) was a French fencer.  He competed at the 1896 Summer Olympics in Athens. He was born in La Rochelle.

Callot won the silver medal in the amateur foil event.  He went undefeated in his preliminary round group, defeating Henri Delaborde, Periklis Pierrakos-Mavromichalis, and Ioannis Poulos.  He then faced fellow Frenchman Eugène-Henri Gravelotte, who had gone undefeated in the other preliminary group, in a final match.  There, he lost to Gravelotte 3–2.

Callot died in Paris on 22 December 1956, aged 80.

References

External links

1875 births
1956 deaths
Fencers at the 1896 Summer Olympics
19th-century sportsmen
French male foil fencers
Olympic silver medalists for France
Olympic fencers of France
Olympic medalists in fencing
Medalists at the 1896 Summer Olympics
Sportspeople from La Rochelle
19th-century French people